Agartala Press Club (Bengali: আগরতলা প্রেস ক্লাব) is the professional club for journalists of Tripura located in the capital Agartala. The current president is Subal Kumar Dey and the General Secretary is Pranab Sarkar.

References

External links 

 www.agartalapressclub.com
Agartala Press Club
Agartala Press Club

Indian journalism organisations